Kari-Anne Jønnes (born 13 April 1972) is a Norwegian politician.

She was elected representative to the Storting from the constituency of Oppland for the period 2021–2025, for the Conservative Party.

In the Storting, she is a member of the Standing Committee on Education and Research for the period 2021–2025.

References

1972 births
Living people
Conservative Party (Norway) politicians
Oppland politicians
Members of the Storting
Women members of the Storting